In genetics, the gene density of an organism's genome is the ratio of the number of genes per number of base pairs, usually written in terms of a million base pairs, or megabase (Mb). The human genome has a gene density of 11-15 genes/Mb, while the genome of the C. elegans roundworm is estimated to have 200.

Seemingly simple organisms, such as bacteria and amoebas, have a much higher gene density than humans. Bacterial DNA has a gene density on the order of 500-1000 genes/Mb. This is due several factors, including that the fact that bacterial DNA has no introns. There are also fewer codons in bacterial genes.

Species

protozoa

fungi

plants

invertebrate

vertebrate non-mammals

vertebrate mammals 

Gene count is calculated by the number of gene flags in the latest version of a given species gtf annotation file. Bear in mind that well studied organisms will probably have higher gene counts because these species have better annotation, therefore these numbers are estimates for comparison.

See also 
 C-value enigma

References 

Genes